The discography of Cam'ron, an American rapper, consists of seven studio albums, three collaborative albums, seven extended plays (EPs), nine mixtapes and 25 singles (including seven as a featured artist).

Albums

Studio albums

Compilation albums

Mixtapes

Collaborative albums

EPs

Singles

As lead artist

As featured artist

Other charted songs

Guest appearances

See also
The Diplomats discography
U.N. discography

References

Hip hop discographies
Discographies of American artists